Antipop vs. Matthew Shipp is a collaborative studio album by Antipop Consortium and Matthew Shipp. It was released on Thirsty Ear Recordings on February 18, 2003.

Critical reception

At Metacritic, which assigns a weighted average score out of 100 to reviews from mainstream critics, the album received an average score of 76, based on 12 reviews, indicating "generally favorable reviews".

Farrell Lowe of All About Jazz described the album as "hip music coming from modern jazz, with hip-hop masters gettin' next to it." Ed Howard of Stylus Magazine gave the album a grade of C, saying: "Despite being a very enjoyable listen from start to finish, this record also has a clear sense of unfulfilled promise." Meanwhile, Marshall Bowden of PopMatters said: "With neither side ceding territory to the other, it is still apparent that these musical forms can interact in meaningful ways."

Track listing

Personnel
Credits adapted from liner notes.

 Antipop Consortium – vocals, synthesizer, programming, production
 Matthew Shipp – piano, production
 William Parker – double bass
 Guillermo E. Brown – drums
 Khan Jamal – vibraphone
 Daniel Carter – trumpet
 Peter Gordon – production
 Cynthia Fetty – design, photography

Charts

References

External links
 

2003 albums
Collaborative albums
Antipop Consortium albums
Matthew Shipp albums
Thirsty Ear Recordings albums